Philiris fulgens, the purple moonbeam, is a species of butterfly of the family Lycaenidae. It is found in Indonesia, New Guinea and Australia (northern Queensland).

The wingspan is about 25 mm. Males have metallic purplish-blue forewings with black wingtips and metallic turquoise hindwings with a black margin. Females are similar, but have a more turquoise coloration, with wider black margins.

The larvae feed on Cryptocarya murrayi, Litsea leefeana, Litsea australis and Endiandra hypotephra. They skeletonize the leaves of their host plant. The larvae are green with a yellow dorsal line. Full-grown larvae can reach a length of about 13 mm. Pupation takes place in an approximately 1 cm long green pupa with a few orange markings and a brown dorsal patch, which is spun under a leaf.

Subspecies
P. f. fulgens (Moluccas, Ambon, Serang)
P. f. bicolorata Wind & Clench, 1947 (Aru)
P. f. kurandae Waterhouse, 1902 (Australia: Cairns district)
P. f. septentrionalis Joicey & Talbot, 1916 (Biak, Kapaur)

References

Butterflies described in 1897
Luciini
Butterflies of Australia
Butterflies of Indonesia
Taxa named by Henley Grose-Smith
Taxa named by William Forsell Kirby